Wang Junmin (April 1955 – 12 November 2018) was a Chinese politician who served as Deputy Communist Party Secretary of Shandong between May 2012 and August 2015. He also served as vice-governor of Shandong between June 2002 and August 2012. During his term in office, he headed the province's industrial and safe production work. He was a delegate to the 18th National Congress of the Communist Party of China.

Biography
Wang was born in Rongcheng, Shandong in April 1955. He entered the workforce in February 1972, and joined the Communist Party of China in December 1973.  After resuming the college entrance examination in September 1983, he entered Shandong University, where he majored in scientific socialism. He was Communist Party Secretary of Zhaoyuan County in February 1987, and held that office until May 1989. In 1989 he was promoted to become Deputy Communist Party Secretary of Yantai, a position he held until 1992. At the end of 1992, he was transferred to Jinan, capital of Shandong province, where he was vice-governor of Shandong from June 2002 to August 2012. He rose to become Specific Deputy Communist Party Secretary of Shandong in August 2012, serving in the post until August 2015. On November 12, 2018, Wang died of illness in Jinan, Shandong, two months after his retirement.

References

1955 births
Shandong University alumni
East China Normal University alumni
Central Party School of the Chinese Communist Party alumni
2018 deaths
People's Republic of China politicians from Shandong
Chinese Communist Party politicians from Shandong